Nicholas Samuel Arnold (born 3 July 1993) is an English footballer who plays as a right-back for National League South side Eastbourne Borough. He made his debut in the Football League in 2013.

Club career

Reading
Arnold joined the Academy at Reading in 2007 and signed a scholarship agreement two years later before turning professional in 2011. He signed a new deal in summer 2012 before extending his contract for a further year on 14 June 2013.

After signing a new contract he immediately joined Wycombe Wanderers on a season-long loan and made his debut as a late substitute against Morecambe on 3 August. He made his full debut two weeks later, starting in the 1–0 home defeat to Mansfield Town. After 33 appearances in all competitions, he returned to Reading at the end of the season and was released by the club in May.

Woking
He trialled at Bradford City in the summer but did not join the club on a permanent basis and eventually signed for Conference Premier side Woking in August 2014. On 6 September 2014, Arnold made his Woking debut in a 3–1 home victory over Lincoln City, in which he replaced Chris Arthur with eight minutes remaining.

Whitehawk
After struggling to make an impression at Woking, Arnold joined Conference South side Whitehawk in October 2014. On 1 November 2014, Arnold made his Whitehawk debut in a 0–0 draw with Havant & Waterlooville, in which he played the full 90 minutes. On 20 December 2014, Arnold scored his first Whitehawk goal in a 2–0 away victory against Sutton United. Arnold played a key part in Whitehawk's playoff campaign, in which they were defeated 2-1 by Boreham Wood in the final through a goal from Junior Morias.

On 3 October 2015, Arnold scored his first goal of the 2015/16 campaign in a 6–0 home victory over St Albans City. On 8 May 2016, Arnold scored the opener in a play-off semi-final tie against Ebbsfleet United. The tie resulted in a 2–1 victory for Whitehawk therefore bringing it to a 3–3 result on aggregate. However, Whitehawk were unsuccessful once again in their promotion aim, with a 3–2 defeat on penalties.
Arnold was named as right back in the Conference South league team of the season in both years he was at Whitehawk.

Aldershot Town
On 28 June 2016, Arnold joined National League side Aldershot Town on a one-year deal, after his contract at Whitehawk was set to expire. On 13 August 2016, Arnold made his Aldershot Town debut in a 2–0 victory against Wrexham, playing the full 90 minutes.

Wealdstone
In June 2019, Arnold joined Wealdstone

Dartford
In January 2020, Arnold joined Dartford

Eastbourne Borough
In October 2020, Arnold joined Eastbourne Borough

Career statistics

References

External links
 

1993 births
Living people
English footballers
Association football fullbacks
Reading F.C. players
Wycombe Wanderers F.C. players
Woking F.C. players
Wealdstone F.C. players
Whitehawk F.C. players
Aldershot Town F.C. players
Eastbourne Borough F.C. players
English Football League players
National League (English football) players
England semi-pro international footballers
People from Tadley